Vanemuine is a theatre in Tartu, Estonia. It was the first Estonian language theatre.

History

1870–1906 The Beginning of the Beginning. Koidula’s Theatre, Wiera’s Theatre. 

On June 24, 1870 was the first day in Estonian theatre history by Lydia Koidula's play "Saaremaa onupoeg" (en: Cousin from Saaremaa) was performed.It was the first Estonian language play and it was performed at the Vanemuine Society house at Jaama Street in Tartu.

Yet, some ten years before the birth of theatre, J. V. Jannsen – the future President of the Vanemuine Society, had quite a negative mentality about theatre, speaking in his newspaper and scolding one reader who had expressed a wish to read more about theatre from the newspaper: "Are you seriously demanding "Postimees" to bring messages from theatre play? Oh, dear, perhaps somebody is to come and ask him about science, in which pub the citizens spend their time each night, what their wives cooked for lunch and who the coachmen have driven every day! That would be something!" (Eesti Postimees, 1865). Five years later when the penman had become acquainted with the activities of the Riga National Society in Latvia, his sentiment towards theatre was already different: "When and where the Estonian people will hear about theatre, we do not know yet; but we wouldn’t be surprised if it didn’t take much time no more." (Eesti Postimees, 1868), and a little later from that same pen: "To play theatre – some might take offence in that – is not strange for the Latvian Society any more. They already have several, some educational, some funny plays to present us, which the Estonian nation still lack of /…/ Where are the Schillers, Goethes, Lessings and Körners and a thousand more playwrights of the Estonian and Latvian people? The required pieces must be made according to the nation’s intellect and about their own life in an austere, pure manner and cut out for the pleasure and enlightenment of the people; but it is not up to any man to give birth to them; in the same manner theatre people are austere and precious among the nation, just like good advice when it is needed. Don’t you worry! …We will talk about our own playwrights in our own time. Give them time to see and learn… After the plays we can look proudly at our own learned men’s hands." (EP, 1870).

For a long time Koidula also hesitated and had doubts about her brave initiative keeping up correspondence with Kreutzwald, who was sceptical about theatre making, as well as with her Finnish friend Antti Almberg, who mediated his homeland's theatre information and injected her optimism.

For the 5th anniversary of the Vanemuine Society, the first theatre performance was ready for the stage. When the curtain fell, the audience saw a farmhouse, painted by painter Frischmuth, and three men appearing in the yard: Heinrich Rosenthal, Harry Jannsen and Tõnis Pekk. Just like antique Greek theatre, the entering Estonian theatre did not recognize female actors and therefore the men had to play also the female roles. Lydia Koidula's first play was an adaption of the play „Der Vetter aus Bremen“ (Cousin from Bremen) by the German playwright Theodor Körner, and being brought into Estonian conditions, cast sharp critical arrows towards the local education system, and was called „Saaremaa onupoeg“ (Cousin from Saaremaa). The play was directed by Lydia Koidula herself. The interest in seeing the play was so great and the sadness of those without a ticket so vast that it was decided to repeat the play the next day. So we may claim that the love of theatre of the Estonian people that has been verified during posterior times was already evident at the premiere of the first production.

The first steps of the national theatre that was called the „Koidula Theatre“, include three plays by Koidula – „Cousin from Saaremaa“ was soon, on September 29, 1870, followed by „Maret ja Miina ehk kosjakased“ (Maret and Miina or the Affiance Birches) and on June 2 and 3, 1871, the artistically most successful of Koidula's theatre plays, an original comedy „Säärane mulk ehk sada vakka tangusoola“. The Koidula Theatre contented herself with these three plays but the door to theatre had been opened and soon came others who continued the path.

The Society's theatre activity became more consistent in 1874 when the stage director's job was taken on by photographer Reinhold Sachker. Sachker was a member of the Vanemuine Society and took actively part as actor in all theatre pieces before becoming stage director. As a good and keen amateur, Sachker did not raise the theatre's level higher but ensured the survival of the theatre and reinforced the tradition of theatre making at the Vanemuine Society with his consistent activity. Sachker himself translated plays by Kotzebue (the drama writer of the 19th century Europe who was staged the most, he came from Germany but for years lived in Tallinn), under his lead the number of new productions increased but these remained quite light in subject matter. The Estonian handicraftsmen of Tartu acted as actors at the theatre of the time.

In 1878, the August Wiera era begun at the Vanemuine, and is called by theatre people as the time of Wiera theatre. The Society's celebration committee selected the man interested in music and plays as the Society's song, orchestra and stage director giving him a certain percentage of the events’ income. This way August Wiera became the first Estonian who committed himself fully to theatre. The man with immense enthusiasm managed to gather around him a large group of people interested in music and plays at the peak time of russification. After a long days work these people were in a daily need of play making in Estonian without pay. Actor Leopold Hansen writes in his memoirs “From the "Vanemuine" paths" about Wiera: „Wiera was very energetic and assembled in himself several stage specialities. He was a music, ballet and play director simultaneously and helped the prima donna sing too when needed. And it was needed almost every time! But this is how it was supposed to be and didn’t bother anyone when the bandmaster suddenly started to hit his foot and sing along, although his voice wasn’t the most beautiful of voices and rattled unpleasantly. When he was ready with beating time, he instantly rushed backstage, grabbed the clarinet man, who hadn’t finished with the note, his instrument and suddenly the audience heard loud whispers and shouts: "Jaan, light the sun!…"“. By the middle of the 1880s the Vanemuine company already had 100 members and performances were given on a regular basis. Wiera had two stage directors to help develop the theatre: Ludvig Menning (years 1878-1886) and Hugo Techner (1886-1891) who mostly took on drama productions. Wiera himself brought music to the Estonian theatre – under his baton the first Estonian language music production, Karl Maria von Weber’s "Preziosa" (1883) was brought on stage. That date is considered as the beginning of Estonian language music theatre. The production remained in the programme an unprecedented time –until 1903, and it was played all together 114 times. After that Wiera’s great love of music brought operettas as well as music plays to the theatre stage that began to thrive during the last years of the century. In 1899, the first opera reaches the stage – Étienne Méhul’s "Joseph in Aegypten". Wiera’s theatre plays Estonian plays as well as sad-sweet stories about Genovevas, Deborahs and Tones, but next to them also the first Estonian language classical productions reach the stage: Molière’s "The Miser" (1888) and Shakespeare’s "The Merchant of Venice" (1888) and "The Taming of the Shrew" (1889). In the name of truth it must be noted that the first "classical swallows" take off in prose translation and with great adaptations and cuts but the opening had been made.

Today it may seem surprising how frivolous a reputation the actor’s profession borne. Actress Amalie Konsa recalled: We were such condemned people! While on stage they praised us, when they met us on streets the mother would tell her daughter: "Don’t look there, let’s cross the street quickly." Actors in the Wiera company had a strict work allocation and every artist had a certain range of roles – those who played fathers never played lovers, etc. Stage director showed all stage entrances and leavings, measured the steps to the right and to the left and showed the right gestures. It was forbidden to turn one’s back to the audience – Wiera went even so far with politeness that he conducted the orchestra with his face towards the audience (meaning that his back was towards the orchestra). In the theatre of these days the prompter was a very important person, in some critics of the time remarks were made when the prompter’s voice sounded already too loudly.

In the 80s the stage was built bigger and the hall was decorated. It may seem curious today that at A. Grenzstein’s expense two fountains were installed to both sides of the stage just for the beauty of it but they were unable to use them for the water fell on orchestra instruments and notes and the instruments got damaged.

Stage design of the time was based on the so-called fundus decoration principle – theatre possessed two to three main designs that were used from production to production regardless of the geography or time of the story. One decoration pictured a room, another one a forest and the third one a street. For the room picture, the big table was brought from the theatre buffet, costumes were combined from production to production regardless of the era that at times created a great blur of styles.

At the verge of the new century, Wiera’s vision of theatre art began to discord with the views of rising Estonian intellectuals, and after the tragic fire of the Vanemuine Society house at Jaama Street in 1903, the Society no longer renewed the contract with Wiera. The fire brought an end to one era, the beginning of a new one started a few years later.

1906–1914 Birth of Estonian vocational theatre. Menning’s Theatre. 

On August 13, 1906 a new era began in the history of Estonian theatre – the newly built Vanemuine theatre building became the first vocational theatre. The director of the new theatre was to become Karl Menning – an educated man with a broad outlook who, before becoming the head of theatre, had studied at the theological faculty of the University of Tartu, then in Germany by Max Reinhardt and broadened his outlook in Western Europe (at the Parisian Antoine Theatre and Berlin Freie Volksbühne). The opening production of the vocational Vanemuine was A. Kitzberg’s play „Tuulte pöörises“ (In the Whirl of Winds) that became the baptism of fire for the fresh theatre company.

The architect of the new and beautiful theatre building was the Finn Armas Lindgren according to whose project the Vanemuine Society had its new building built at the Aia Street (the current Vanemuise Street). Many donations were gathered in order to build the house and the people of Tartu were very pleased with the result. The interior of the house was decorated with plentiful ornaments, A.Weitzenberg’s sculptures „Dawn“ and „Dusk“ stood at the top of the lobby staircase railings. Garden design was finished by 1907 and according to the designs of A. Lindgren was made by theatre director Menning personally. Unfortunately it became clear quite soon after the house was operational that it is not the most suitable f buildings to make theatre – the theatre hall without an audience rise was uncomfortable, and with bad acoustics, and very poorly lit... On the occasion of the building’s opening, A. Kitzberg wrote in "Postimees": „The house has a character of its own, the plan maker building artist has put something in it, has managed to say something with it. We feel tunes within ourselves touched that are somewhat familiar, immanent to us – that stand in accord with ourselves… The house with its two powerful towers on the street side reminds us about something heavy, long lasting, steady, something that is not to be crushed easily, that will not bend, and that wants to protect itself… When the artist has this way given the house the power and influence of a monumental building from the street side, the garden side of the building is light, open, and happy on the contrary, something that exposes itself to beauty and sun…“ (Postimees, August 12, 1906).

Compared to earlier times, Karl Menning brought significantly different principles and working methods to Estonian theatre. He put the theatre’s educational goals in the foreground that respectively resulted in a very well-thought choice of repertoire. The frivolous entertainment theatre disappeared and modern Western European problem plays and Estonian national dramaturgy appeared. Instead of operettas, that Menning considered as a danger to the good taste of actors and the audience, Menning dealt with the musical education of the people of Tartu in another manner – he participated actively in the foundation of the Vanemuine Symphony Orchestra (1908) and he himself played oboe at the orchestra. The first conductor of the orchestra was Samuel Lindpere, the opening concert took place on May 7, 1908. Menning brought psychological realism to the theatre – in director’s as well as actor’s work, he liquidated the prompter from the theatre and supported the actor’s inner and external incarnation into the role. Menning’s theatre was an ensemble theatre where all the production’s components were subject to the forwarding of the main thing – the idea of the production. Menning considered the theatre’s educational function highly important – it was important to educate the audience ethically, aesthetically and morally. He also organised play interpretation nights and performed there with various presentations himself.

The initial cast of the vocational Vanemuine was: Ants Simm – a wide range character actor who soon became Menning’s right hand in production preparations; Anna Altleis – highly talented and a charming actress who soon, for reason, became the favourite of the theatre audience; Leopold Hansen – a comic by God’s grace whose talents were best manifested in folk plays; Amalie Konsa – the prima donna of the Wiera company who played herself big in the roles of mothers and grandmothers at the Menning theatre; Karl Kadak – an emotional actor who only worked three seasons at the theatre and then returned to the field of law; Hans Rebane – stronger in comical roles but also his theatre path remained short, later he became a diplomat; Anna Markus – joined the Menning company in 1907 and excelled in her intellectual and rational approach to roles, she was a good character actor and was well suited for the leading roles of the Strindberg and Ibsen plays; Olga Västrik-Teetsov – her greatest success lied in the roles of young girls and ladies; Karl Triipus – excelled with his musicality and good singing voice. A little later Liina Reiman, Elviine Annuk (later Mari Möldre), Eduard Türk, Aleksander Teetsov, August Sunne, Julius Põder, Ruut Tarmo and others joined the company.

Over time Menning’s principles and strictness created discord in the Vanemuine Society board as well as among the audience. The opposition demanded a repertoire that was lighter and more entertaining – a demand that Karl Menning could not accept. In 1914 after the meeting of the Society board he announced his retirement, that also ended his theatre path – later he worked as a theatre critic in Tallinn and represented the Republic of Estonia as a diplomat.

1914–1934 Vanemuine after the retirement of Menning. The low tide period. 

After Karl Menning left, the Vanemuine entered a complicated period of time that in other words could be called a long creative low tide. The decay lasted for almost 20 years. After Menning had left, the theatre management was taken over by Ants Simm who had been his right hand thus far. He worked as artistic director and head stage director during 1914-1921. In 1916, 11 actors out of the 21-member company left (including E. Türk, A. Sunne, O. Teetsov, A. Teetsov, A. Markus) who stepped out for their artistic beliefs and did not agree with the entertaining nature of the theatre that was imposed by the Vanemuine Society. The actors who left Vanemuine started a new theatre in Tallinn that was called the "Pandorini troupe" at first, and which later grew to be the current Estonian Drama Theatre.

But the low tide of the Vanemuine increased speed – new productions were brought out in haste and superficially, the repertoire was dominated by operettas and comedies, and intrigues within the theatre gained ground. The numbers talking about the Vanemuine Symphony Orchestra, on the other hand, are astounding: in 1915 the orchestra under head conductor Juhan Aavik performed as many as 95 times and gathered 39 494 listeners during the year! The Vanemuine garden open-air concerts certainly play an important role in these numbers. For a long time, the Vanemuine Symphony Orchestra was directed by Juhan Simm (head conductor in 1914-1916 and conductor in 1916-1941).

After Ants Simm left the theatre director’s seat, the theatre was run by a committee of actors, during 1925-1931 Voldemar Mettus was at the lead of the theatre and August Sunne after him. It goes without saying that this theatre period included artistical successes too but in comparison to the large number of productions, they were a minority. This period undoubtedly contains top roles by Liina Reiman and spectacular parts by August Sunne, Eduard Türk, Rudolf Ratassepp, Anna Markus and Mari Möldre. The majority of the productions were staged by Edurad Türk and Voldemar Mettus. The music theatre favouring operettas that did not rise to a higher artistic level, operas were staged rarely and head conductor Juhan Simm’s efforts to take on a more art-central course did not come through.

Low audience figures were experienced at the beginning of the 30s when the nearly 1000-seat hall was scarcely filled to one-third of its capacity. Although the theatre received state support, debts grew very dramatically. Theatre management at that time was as to the competence of the theatre society – the board also decided upon the hiring of theatre director and stage directors, the formation of the company and the choice of repertoire. Neither the artistic director nor stage directors had a decisive voice in artistical matters. The outdated management created a situation where the different officials of the society had too much say in theatre’s artistic matters and caused the exorbitant thriving of the operetta genre. In 1929 this situation even led to a memorandum where the intelligentsia protested against the theatre’s operetta favouritism – among others, the letter was also signed by August Annist, Alfred Koort, Andrus Saareste, Juhan Sütiste, Juhan Semper, Gustav Suits, Aino Suits, Elo Tuglas and Friedebert Tuglas. „Should the abnormal situation that has formed around the "Vanemuine" Theatre continue, the establishment of a new artistic drama theatre inevitably arises into the agenda“, the letter stated.

1935–1944 Rafter party and ruins. The time of great change. 

In 1935 the long sleep of the Vanemuine was interrupted. The Vanemuine Society board’s power over the theatre was cut down, Otto Aloe became the new theatre director, Eino Uuli became the opera director, Ida Urbel became the director of movement and Kaarli Aluoja became the drama director. Beside Juhan Simm also Eduard Tubin began working as conductor. Grave drama pieces and operas were included in the repertoire, the proportion of operettas decreased. In 1939 the first full-length production of the Vanemuine ballet company was brought on stage – „The Carnival Suite“ to the music by P. Tchaikovsky – that date is considered as the birth of the Vanemuine ballet theatre. In 1941 the first full-length ballet was brought on stage – C. Pugni’s „Esmeralda“. Finally, they also took on the building’s reconstruction works and in autumn 1939, the long-awaited new theatre hall and stage were completed (the theatre hall that was built in 1906 was without an audience rise and therefore very uncomfortable, the stage also lacked a number of necessary technical innovations). The 500-seat theatre hall opened in 1939 was one of the most modern ones in the Baltic States, the former theatre hall was rebuilt into a concert hall. However, in August 1944, the theatre (it was showing „Tartu“) was hit by a bomb and was destroyed in the fire. The Vanemuine library was also destroyed along with the biggest music sheet collection of the Baltic States.

During the German occupation, the theatre remained open; Aleksander Eller was theatre director then. Theatre attendance was high. The production of „Kratt“ (The Womble, 1943) by Eduard Tubin became an event on its own.

1944-1968 Vanemuine in the Soviet Estonia. Ird’s Theatre. 

After the war had ended, the Vanemuine began work in the German Handicraftsmen theatre building (the current Vanemuine Small Building) that had been reconstructed during the war into a cinema. The theatre people who returned to town built and reconstructed the building with their own resources, and on December 21, 1944, the opening performance took place. The theatre as a whole with its workshops and rehearsal rooms did not fit inside the building and therefore the theatre also used the buildings at Vanemuine Street 52 and 54. Theatre’s employees, together with actors, singers and orchestra members, built the necessary workshops. Many plans were made to renovate the old theatre building but for several reasons they did not materialise. The ruins stood for years in the middle of the town and eventually it was decided to build a completely new building.

After the war Kaarel Ird became the theatre’s artistic director, he led the theatre with small forced pauses for 40 years – 1944–1948, 1949–1950 and 1955–1985. Since 1966, Ird was the theatre’s head stage director as well as theatre director. During 1950–1953 the Vanemuine was led by the actor Andrei Poljakov who did not speak Estonian, and during 1953-1955 by Ants Lauter.

The educational path of Kaarel Ird was complicated and episodic; his theatre education came from the Tartu Drama Theatre Society’s Theatre Art Studio and from the Pärnu and Tartu Workers’ Theatre. During the years 1939–1940 he sang in the Vanemuine choir and after the war and the change of regime he became the long-time theatre director of the Vanemuine. Already before 1940, Ird, coming from the working class, felt sympathy towards a leftist worldview meaning working class against the power—for that reason he had several collisions with the society order in force. Because of his political views, Ird was a suitable candidate for the theatre director’s post at the Vanemuine. All of his „leavings“ from that post were connected to the repressions of the power that even Kaarel Ird couldn’t escape (in the 1950s he was forced to leave the Vanemuine). In 1948–1949 Ird was the director of ESSR Government of Arts, in 1950–1952 he managed a drama company in Tartu and in 1952–1955 he was the head stage director of Pärnu Endla Theatre. The state honoured him with many high rewards for his long work as theatre and stage director. The controversial person in Ird and his role in the community and his accomplishments as an artist and theatre director still create ambivalent feelings and emotions. Vanemuine was not merely a work placement for Ird but his life’s work. Ird has described his relationship with art in such a way: „Art is work, work and more work. And it is not right that we are ashamed to talk about it as work. Talent is a natural resource. And the community has the right to demand that a person who has been given that natural resource, would handle it favourably. But for an artist to favourably handle his talent means never-ending work with himself.“ Ird in his nature was an enhancer of the world and believed that good art (including theatre art) can make a person to be better. When fighting and debating the power apparatus he was a skillful demagogue and made use of all the system’s weaknesses in order to reach the objective. Surely his complex and angular character was not perfect to run a big collective, and over the years quite a number of conflicts aroused within the collective but also Ird’s critics have readily admitted that his skills and services in developing the Vanemuine theatre are immeasurable. Ird himself has described his relationship with the Vanemuine in a private letter to Olaf Utt with the words: „For me the Vanemuine theatre was part of the Estonian culture /…/, valuable and sacred as the Museum of Literature, Museum of Ethnography, the library of a university/…/. I know that if I left the „Vanemuine“ now there wouldn't be a single person who could sustain the theatre's level. And I even don't know whether I can do that. Especially under the circumstances when we receive little to no help at all.“ (1966)

When rebuilding the theatre in 1944, the Vanemuine had no house nor actors—many theatre people had left Estonia during the war. Ird continued the evolved traditions at the Vanemuine—the theatre preserved three genres and the youngest of them – ballet – developed thrivingly under new conditions. In his numerous speeches and publications, Ird repeatedly brought up Karl Menning’s ideals: psychological realism, ensemble-play principle, and also the development of national dramaturgy were important in the artistic beliefs of Menning as well as Ird.

At the end of the 1940s extreme ideological recession set in the Soviet society that also influenced the theatres. The ruthless ideologization of repertoire (soviet plays, political plays, etc were favoured) drove the audience away from theatre. Seasons were tense; there were nearly 15 new productions. In the 40s the main load as stage directors was carried by Kaarel Ird, Ilmar Tammur and Kaarli Aluoja, in the 50s Epp Kaidu and Gunnar Kilgas joined in more vigorously, in the music theatre Ida Urbel, Udo Väljaots, Kaarel Ird and Epp Kaidu acted as stage directors. In the post-war decades, the Vanemuine orchestra was led by conductors Jaan Hargel (1944–1966), Raivo Kursk (1943-1949), Aleksei Dolgušin (head conductor in 1952-1958) and Aadu Regi (1945–1951). Johannes Lükki, Elo Tamul, Artur Rinne, Endel Aimre, Rudolf Jõks, Endel Ani, Linda Tanni, Elsa Lamp and Aino Seep excelled as soloists. At that time the tradition of summer open-air performances was initiated, E. Aava’s „Vikerlased“ 1955 (director U. Väljaots, premiere in stationary) became a grand event that in 1959 was performed by the River Emajõgi to 16,000 spectators.

The Vanemuine ballet company had to be reformed after the war for many dancers had left Estonia. Nonetheless, in 1946 S. Prokofiev's „Romeo and Juliet“ reached the stage. The first leading dancers were Udo Väljaots and Velda Otsus. Both were also good actors on the drama stage and Velda Otsus became a highly appreciated drama actress after her ballerina career. They were followed by Ülo Rannaste and Maie Maasik as theatre's new leading dancers.

The Vanemuine ballet theatre has been characterized throughout the years by the diversity of the means of expression, and the willingness to search and experiment. In the case of several developmental periods it would even be more suitable to use the term „dance theatre“ rather than „ballet“ in the European classical sense. Neither was the ballet company left untouched by the changes in the society—in the 1940s and 50s ideology strongly influenced the dance language—the classical dance en pointe became the nearly sole possible means of expression in the creation of any dance piece. At the beginning of the 50s the ballet company had 41 members; after that, layoffs reduced the company to 18 members. By 1957 the number had risen to 24 dancers—a number that is clearly insufficient keeping in mind classical ballet compositions. Ida Urbel as ballet director had her certain handwriting that readily synthesized ballet, contemporary dance and pantomime interactively. Great classics are not staged at that period of time, however „The Nutcracker“, „Esmeralda“ and „Peer Gynt“ reach the stage. In the 50s dancers with a strong classical schooling joined the company—Elena Poznjak (Kõlar), Regina Tõško (Süvalep).

In the beginning of the 1950s the abolition of musical genres from the Vanemuine emerged acutely to the agenda. As the state reduced theatres’ grants and Kaarel Ird had been fended off the Vanemuine with formalism accusations, they were very close to making the Vanemuine a drama theatre, as a result of layoffs opera and ballet vegetated for years. Although the music genres remained, these collectives underwent great layoffs that made the bringing forth of productions very complicated.

In 1956, soon after the return of Kaarel Ird to the Vanemuine drama director's position, an opportunity to travel to Moscow opened up for the Vanemuine, to present its art at the Estonian art and literature decade. After the successful performance the theatre gained an honourable denomination—Estonia SSR National Theatre Vanemuine with a work red flag order. The head of drama and theatre determined to be visible also beyond Estonia ever since. In 1957 they travelled to give performances in Kiev. The local press wrote about the Vanemuine performance with the words: „…Certainly, we do not favour the blind copying of the Vanemuine Theatre although it truly is a good theatre with a highly progressive culture. We would rather see that we also raised such actors who could pass along our nation’s virtuosity in all its richness and peculiarity on stage. Such thoughts sprung up at the performance of the Estonian art masters that – we repeat – offered great pleasure and aesthetical satisfaction to the Ukrainian theatre guests.„ (Literaturnaja Gazeta, Kiev). In 1960 the Vanemuine gave an opera performance at the Moscow Kreml Theatre where they presented E. Kapp's „Talvemuinasjutt“ (Winter Fairytale), G. Ernesaks’ “Tuleristsed“ (Baptism of Fire) and B. Kõrver's “Laanelill“ (Winter Green). Critics were praising. In Estonia as well as abroad, the Vanemuine versatile company was denoted and recognized for performing with equal mastery in the music as well as the drama genre. Priit Põldroos wrote in 1957 that in the development of Estonian national theatre historic traditions a theatre with a completely new visage has shaped out of the Vanemuine where different genres complement each other.

The Vanemuine at beginning of the 1960s is characterized by stability. Of the company's core till now, work was continued by Arnold Kasuk, Benno Mikkal, Elmar Salulaht, Elo Tamul, Elmar Kivilo, Aleksander Mälton, Helend Peep, Hilda Sooper, Paul Maivel, Voldemar Paavel, Aleksander Laar, Leopold Hansen. At that period the theatre was left behind by Ants Lauter, Velda Otsus, Gunnar Kilgas, Ellen Kaarma  and Heli Viisimaa, company was joined by Herta Elviste, Lembit Eelmäe, Lia Laats, Einari Koppel, Milvi Koidu, Ants Ander, Jaan Saul, Kulno Süvalep, Ellen Liiger, Heikki Haravee. During that period also the Vanemuine study studios began their work where Ird trained a new generation for its company. The first studio started work in 1961, it raised such new actors to the company as: Evald Aavik, Kais Adlas, Raivo Adlas, Evald Hermaküla, Malle Koost, Virve Meerits, Kersti Neem, Ao Peep, Jaan Kiho, Kuno Otsus, Raimu Maiksar. More actors came from the following studios too (altogether four classes graduated). Soviet plays (Arbuzov, Štein, Simonov), Estonian plays (Juhan Smuul, Raimond Kaugver, Egon Rannet, August Kitzberg, Ardi Liives) as well as world classics (Shakespeare, Brecht) are being staged.

During that period music productions were staged mostly by theatre's own employed directors. The theatre's former leading dancer Udo Väljaots was in top form as director in the 50s: W. A. Mozart's „Cosi fan tutte“, E. Arro/ L. Normet's „Rummu Jüri“, etc. Epp Kaidu staged Estonian originals implementing his best skills in direction also in the genre of music. Productions were vivid, credible and emotional and the audience voted very loudly for them with their feet (B. Kõrver's operettas „Ainult unistus“ / Only Dream 1955, „Laanelill“ / Winter Green 1959, „Teie soov, palun?“ / Your Wish, Please?, Valter Ojakäär's opera „Kuningal on külm“ / The King is Cold 1967).  At the end of his directing career also Ida Urbel began to stage operas (Puccini's „Tosca“ (1969), Bizet's „Carmen“ (1969), Prokofiev's „The Gambler“ world premiere (1970) and operettas „Silva“(1979), „The Merry Widow“ (1971)). Theatre director Kaarel Ird also made a number of music productions and with success, he staged Estonian originals already during post-war years (E. Kapp's „Tasuleegid“ / Flames of Revenge 1945, G. Ernesaks’ „Pühajärv“/ Sacred Lake 1947 and „Tormide rand“ / The Coast of Storms 1949). Especially successful is considered the cycle of productions with folklore elements: „Meestelaulud“ / The Songs of Men 1966, „Külavahelaulud“ / Village Songs 1972 and „Naistelaulud“ / The Songs of Women 1977. Ird also staged the premiere of E. Tubin's opera „Reigi õpetaja“ / The Parson of Reigi 1979. The 1960-70s were joyful years for the music company – the cast of soloists was supplemented, critics were praising in Estonia as well as abroad. During that period the Vanemuine head conductor was Erich Kõlar (during 1952-1980), Valdeko Viru worked for a long period of time as conductor (1969-1991). Soloists Valentina Hein, Aino Seep, Endel Ani, Ivo Kuusk, Johannes Lükki, Elo Tamul, Lehte Mark, Linda Tanni, Elsa Lamp and Evald Tordik made outstanding roles, during the years 1964-1969 Margarita Voites worked at the Vanemuine as soloist.

In 1962 Ülo Vilimaa joined the ballet company as soloist, at the end of the 60s he also began to stage. At that period the company contained classical soloists with a very good standard—Elena Poznjak, Rufina Noor, Alla Udovenko and others.

The „melting years“ of the Soviet society affected the theatre in a positive way – the ideological control weakened, the theatre found a common language with the audience. Theatre's travels around the Soviet Union were continued – Leningrad 1965; Riga 1966; Moscow 1967; Riga 1969; Petroskoi, 1969. Union-wide theatre meetings and seminars were held at the Vanemuine, the theatre was visited by many renowned cultural figures. Ties of friendship were concluded with the Hans Otto Theatre in the German Democratic Republic. Theatre's sport sections were very active: „As an example to the current younger theatre people, Johannes Lükki’s (former outstanding tenor, opera and operetta soloist) theatre and sports activity during one single day is worth remembering. On a summer Sunday morning Johannes Lükki was at a volleyball training and after that performed at the afternoon performance of „The Three Musketeers“ as Aramis. In the football match after the performance he played inside right at the Vanemuine team. In the evening he sang with great success the part of Herman in „The Queen of Spades“.(„„Vanemuine“ Today and Yesterday", 1970). In 1966 the Vanemuine was denominated as an academic theatre.

For the Vanemuine, the 60s are important for one more reason—the building of the new house finally starts that was completed in 1967. The building was designed by A. Volberg, P. Tarvas and U. Tölpus, interior design by V. Tamm. In 1970 also the concert hall was opened. The opening of the new theatre building took place on November 3, 1967, the first premier—Eino Tamberg's opera „Raudne kodu“ (Iron Home)—was brought on stage on December 9.

1969–1985 Theatre innovation. End of the Ird-period 

At the end of the '60s a movement evolved in the Estonian theatre that has been called as theatre innovation. The Vanemuine became the centre of the innovation. The new generation that came to the theatre brought along a more modern theatre vision—a wish to change and abolish canons, to do something differently. Such young directors took charge in the Vanemuine as Jaan Tooming and Evald Hermaküla bringing on stage the P.- E. Rummo's „Tuhkatriinumängu“ / A Cinderella Play (director E. Hermaküla, 1969) and A. Kitzberg's „Laseb käele suud anda“ / Allows to Kiss on the Hand (J. Tooming, 1969). Novel productions in dance theatre were made by Ülo Vilimaa („Contrasts“ 1967; „Hands“ 1973; „Mermaid“ 1974). One of the ideologists in the theatre innovation focus stood the future director Mati Unt who then worked at the theatre's literature department. Directors changed plays’ texts to reflect their own ideas more suitably; productions were more physical and filled with symbols and metaphors. The younger theatre audience embraced the novel theatre quickly, the more conservative audience needed time to adapt. The staging of theatre innovative productions did not proceed without problems from the ideological point of view either – „A Cinderella Play“  was not given staging permission, the production was made without permission but was then, after the dress rehearsal declared unsuitable by a censor. Theatre director Ird spent almost a year fighting fiercely before getting the permission to stage that production. Censorship interfered even later in Tooming's and Hermaküla's productions—one time they did not give permission to perform, another time there were problems with the changing of text. In the second half of the 70s Jaan Tooming had a very powerful production cycle bringing on stage national literature classics. A. H. Tammsaare / O. Tooming's „Põrgupõhja uus Vanapagan“ / Hell's New Old Nick 1976; A. Kitzberg's „Kauka jumal“ / The God of Money 1977; A. H. Tammsaare / O. Tooming's „Tõde ja õigus“ / Truth and Justice 1978. Actors Lembit Eelmäe, Heikki Haravee, Raivo Adlas, Raine Loo made spectacular roles. Epp Kaidu also continued to perform in top form with his productions („The Tragedy of Man“ 1971).

Head conductor was continuously Erich Kõlar, conductors Valdeko Viru and Endel Nõgene (1974–1980 conductor, 1980–1981 head conductor) worked beside him. At that period soloists Lehte Mark, Aino Seep, Endel Aimre, Johannes Lükki, Jassi Zahharov, Taisto Noor, Aavo Hinno, Evi Vanamölder, Väino Karo, Silvia Vestmann, Henn Pai, Vivian Kallaste, Maimu Krinal worked at the theatre.

Kaarel Ird's role in the theatre innovation must be emphasized—although the innovative theatre did not belong to his art preferences, he favoured the activities of the young directors in every way and defended them before the system when needed. Many former theatre people have accentuated that in any other theatre in Estonia such a thing would not have been possible. However, it has been supposed that Kaarel Ird did not defend so much the theatre innovation as the talents, being concerned about the continuation of Estonian theatre.

In the beginning of the 70s Vanemuine also travelled to the German Democratic Republic (in summer 1971 they gave a gala performance and in 1973 the production „Külavahelaulud“ / Village Songs went to Germany). Vanemuine went to Hungary in 1972 with Imre Madách’ „The Tragedy of Man“ and Smuul's „Kihnu Jõnn“. In Finland they gave performances with the production „Külavahelaulud“ / Village Songs and „Üks ullike läks rändama“ / A Silly One Went to Wander in 1974. Important were also the 1971 tour to Leningrad and the guest performances of 1975 in Moscow. Union wide critics were interested in the Vanemuine and gave positive feedback, the theatre had a very good reputation in the Soviet Union. In 1979 the Vanemuine was selected to represent the Soviet theatre at the reputable BITEF-festival in Belgrade. Organizers wished to see „Põrgupõhja uus Vanapagan“ / Hell's New Old Nick at the festival but as the hosts were not able to solve the technical problems attached to the production, they took production “Tagahoovis” / In the Back Yard to the festival instead.

Also during the 70s Ird was the director with the most load at the Vanemuine (top productions „Külavahelaulud“ / Village Songs 1972, „Tagahoovis“ / In the Back Yard 1974), drama directors were Kaidu, Tooming, Hermaküla and Süvalep. During the change of the decade Raivo Adlas made his first attempts—J. Švarts’ „Punamütsike“ / Little Red Riding-hood 1982, O. Luts’ „Summer“ 1984. From 1977–1983 Kaarin Raid was employed as director at the Vanemuine—I. Drutse's „The Holy of Holies“ 1977 (the intriguing pair Tooming-Hermaküla in leading roles), O. Anton's „Laudalüürika“ / Barn Lyrics 1980. Ida Urbel was employed as director in the genre of music, but most of the music productions borne the names of Ird or Kaidu, and Kuno Otsus also directed. Colourful roles in the 70s were made by Jaan Tooming as actor (Tot in L. Andrejev's „ He Who Gets Slapped“ 1971, Lucifer in I. Madach’ „The Tragedy of Man“ 1971, Fajunin in L. Leonov's “Vallutusretk” / The Invasion 1975), who was seconded by another director, Evald Hermaküla as actor (Adam in „The Tragedy of Man“ 1971, Josef in Kajetán Tyl's „The Bagpiper of Strakonice“ 1973 and others). At the change of the decade three young talented actors joined the company—Hannes Kaljujärv, Aivar Tommingas and Jüri Lumiste. Nearly half of the Vanemuine repertoire was formed up by Estonian dramaturgy—new Estonian plays as well as classics and theatrical representations. It was in theatre director Ird's Vanemuine-vision a priority to look after the abundance and growth of Estonian material.

In 1974 Ülo Vilimaa took over Ida Urbel's position as ballet director.

In 1978 there was a fire in the Vanemuine Small Building. The house waited for a long time to be renovated and was opened for public only in 1990.

In 1983 the Vanemuine gave guest performances also in Sweden, three performances were given in Stockholm—full houses were to „Põrgupõhja uus Vanapagan“ / Hell's New Old Nick and „Faehlmann“, the third – M. Gorki's „Yegor Bulychov and Others“ remained without greater audience interest.

Since 1972 the Vanemuine was the most visited theatre in Estonia during the coming decade, visitors’ record was set during 1978–1981 when the theatre received 256,000 visitors per year. It is essential to mark here that entertaining repertoire was staged very little at that time.

The Vanemuine Theatre is home to a ballet company.

From the Soviet Union to the independent Estonia. 

At hindsight the 1980s are known as stagnation years in the social sense. There were changes also within the Vanemuine. In 1976 Epp Kaidu died, in 1983 Ida Urbel; Jaan Tooming was theatre director of Viljandi Ugala Theatre during 1979-1983 and then returned to the Vanemuine. Evald Hermaküla left in 1983 to the Estonian Drama Theatre. In 1985 Kaarel Ird also finished his life's work at the Vanemuine.

In 1985 Ago-Endrik Kerge became the new drama director; he remained in that position until 1990. The theatre had a high standard and enjoyed a multitude of visitors. Also the drama director added to this with his successful productions in several genres: (A. H. Tammsaare/ A.-E. Kerge's „Aeg tulla, aeg minna“ / Time to Come, Time to Go 1986, Jaan Kruusvall's „Vaikuse vallamaja“ / The Parish House of Silence 1987; G. Rossini's „The Barber of Seville“ 1981; W. A. Mozart's „The Marriage of Figaro“ 1983; R. Kangro's „Ohver“ / The Victime 1983). Jaan Tooming made spectacular productions: Čapek's „R.U.R.“ 1986, Orff's „The Moon“ 1986, Eliot's „Murder in the Cathedral“ 1989, Ibsen's „The Wild Duck“ 1990, Duncan's „The Rehearsale“ 1990, Priestley's „I Have Been Here Before“ 1991 and others. In 1981 Vassili Medvedjev joined the Vanemuine ballet company who began work as soloist as well as director. Beside his great soloist roles he also directed S. Prokofiev's „Peter and the Wolf“ (1982) and F. Benoist’ / C. Pugni's „Satanilla“ (1984). Ülo Vilimaa too was in top form (L. Auster's „Tiina“, 1984; E. Kapp's „Kalevipoeg“ / Son of Kalev, 1985). During 1987-1999 the head conductor of the Vanemuine was Endel Nõgene. Lehte Mark, Taisto Noor, Jassi Zahharov, Eve Randkivi, Rando Piho, Silvia Vestmann, Henn Pai, Vivian Kallaste, Evald Tordik, Tõnu Kattai excelled among the soloists.

In 1990–1993 the Vanemuine Theatre was managed by Linnar Priimägi who stood out for a fascinating programme-classical choice of repertoire (Goethe's „Faust“, Wilde's „Salome“, Camus’ „Caligula“ and others) but at the same time he is written in the history books as the creator of great contradictions and conflicts within the creative collective. His diagnosis as theatre director that opera theatre in Europe is a declining phenomenon will also remain in history (TMK 1994/4).

In 1994 Jaak Viller became theatre director, together with him the theatre's management system also changed – three artistic director's positions were formed: Jüri Lumiste (1993-1999) started work as drama director, Ülo Vilimaa (1974-1997) continued work as ballet director and Endel Nõgene (1987-1999) as music director. In 1997 Mare Tommingas became the theatre's ballet director. In 1992 she established her own dance studio by the Vanemuine and used her students also in her productions. Her productions: C. Orff's „Carmina Burana“ 1991, D. Farnshawe's „African Sanctus“/ Mercury and Morani's „Barcelona“, 1992, B. Bartok's „The Miraculous Mandarin“ 1994, P. Tchaikovsky's „The Nutcracker“ 1994. Top roles were danced by Aivar Kallaste, Jelena Karpova, Oleg Titov.

During the intervening transition years (the liberation of Estonia, economically instable years) the theatre's situation was very complicated – there was not enough audience and the choice of repertoire was not the most successful. From 1994 the road began to go uphill again. During that period the core of the drama company was formed by Liina Olmaru, Hannes Kaljujärv, Merle Jääger, Aivar Tommingas, Rain Simmul, Raine Loo, Herta Elviste, Lembit Eelmäe, Andres Dvinjaninov, Riho Kütsar. Beside Jaan Tooming new directors emerged such as Ain Mäeots („Susi“ / Wolf 1995; „Beauty Queen of Leenane“ 1999; „Pühak“ / Saint 2001; „Taarka“ 2005) and Tiit Palu. During that period Mati Unt as guest director stood out most strongly – „Iwona, the Princess of Burgundy“ 1994; „Heavenly Love and Earthly Love“ 1995; „Hamlet“ 1997; „Wedding Ceremony“ 2000; „The Master and Margarita“ 2000; „The Cherry Orchard“ 2001 and others. Other successful productions at the theatre were made by Mikk Mikiver – „Twelve Angry Men“ 1997; „War and Peace“ 1999; opera „Tosca“ 1995 and Finn Poulsen (Sweden) – „The Story of the Little Old Man“ 1996; „Twelfth Night“ 1998. Later, many guest directors have visited the theatre: Tiit Ojasoo („Blood Brothers“ 2001; „Roberto Zucco“ 2002; „Ruja“ 2008), Mart Koldits („Flew Over the Cuckoo’s Nest“ 2004; „Jumpers“ 2007), Hendrik Toompere jun. („One Hundred years…“ 2006).

In 2003 when theatre halls began to remain empty again (there were several reasons – the choice of repertoire but also the active onslaught of the entertainment industry), general manager Aivar Mäe came to the Vanemuine who was replaced by Paavo Nõgene in 2007.

In the beginning of the new millennium head conductors have changed frequently: in 1999-2004 Mihkel Kütson, in 2004-2006 Hendrik Vestmann, in 2006-2007 Toomas Vavilov, from 2008 again Mihkel Kütson. In 1993-2016 Lauri Sirp has worked at the theatre as conductor. Besides operas, operettas and concerts the Vanemuine stationary repertoire also contains musicals. Opera soloists who have made spectacular roles are Karmen Puis, Alla Popova, Merle Jalakas, Taisto Noor, Atlan Karp, Märt Jakobson, Valentina Kremen, Rasmus Kull, Pirjo Jonas, Reigo Tamm. Also many guest directors (D. Bertman, I. Roga, A. Siegert, G. Malvius) and soloists have worked at the theatre.

During 1999–2006 the Vanemuine drama was led by Ain Mäeots, 2007-2010 this work is carried on by Sven Karja. Ain Mäeots and Robert Annus work at the theatre as drama directors, later also Tiit Palu, Andres Noormets, Tanel Jonas, directing actors are Jüri Lumiste and Ott Sepp. There has been a lot of movement among actors; in 2010 the company comprises 21 members. There are many guest directors including directors from abroad (Barrie Rutter from England, Aljona Anohhina from Russia) as well as more interesting characters from Estonia (Uku Uusberg, Ingomar Vihmar, Hendrik Toompere jn). Memorable drama roles have been made by Hannes Kaljujärv, Aivar Tommingas, Külliki Saldre, Merle Jääger, Jüri Lumiste, Riho Kütsar.

Since 2004 the Vanemuine ballet company has become very transnational – as the Estonian dance schools could not train enough dancers for the Vanemuine, the doors of the theatre are open to talented dancers from all over the world. In the 2000s many guest choreographers have directed at the theatre: Dmitri Harchenko, Rachid Tika, Matteo Moles, Mai Murdmaa, Toomas Edur, Stanislav Fečo, Vassili Medvedjev, Hugo Fanari, Saša Pepeljajev, Pär Isberg and the Vanemuine people Mare Tommingas, Oleg Titov (member of the Vanemuine until 2004), Ruslan Stepanov, Janek Savolainen and Silas Stubbs.

Paul Mägi has been the music director and chief conductor of Vanemuine Theatre since 2011. Toomas Peterson became the theatre's general manager and Tiit Palu became the theatre's drama director in 2013. Mare Tommingas continues as its ballet director.

As at 2017, the theatre has three stationary venues: the Grand Building, the Small Building and the Harbour Theatre. Additionally, plays for young audiences are performed at the Theatre House in the Tartu Toy Museum.

As at 2017, the theatre employs 363 people. Vanemuine Theatre has a 67-member symphony orchestra, a musical ensemble of nine singers, a 22-member drama troupe, a 33-member ballet troupe and a 33-member opera chorus. Vanemuine continues to be one of Estonia's most popular theatres – in 2016, it had 161,647 visitors.

References

External links 
 

Theatres in Estonia
Culture in Tartu
Theatres built in the Soviet Union
Buildings and structures in Tartu